Bizarre Gardening Accident is the second album released by the band Angry Salad. It was released in 1997 by Breaking World Records. 
The album's title is a reference to the rock mock documentary This Is Spinal Tap, in which the members of the fictional band Spinal Tap explain that one of their former drummers died in a "bizarre gardening accident".

Track listing
 "Empty Radio"
 "Scared Of Highways"
 "Stretch Armstrong"
 "The Milkshake Song"
 "Rico"
 "99 Red Balloons"
 "How Does It Feel To Kill?"
 "Saturday Girl"
 "Coming To Grips"
 "Red Cloud"

Personnel
 Bob Whelan: Guitar and Vocals
 Alex Grossi: Guitar
 James Kinne: Bass and Backing Vocals (on Rio)
 Hale Pulsifer: Drums
 Steve Monayer: Bass (on all tracks except Rio)
 Jeff Bluestein: Piano, Organ and Backing Vocals
 Seth Connolly : additional guitar
 Rob Aquino : additional guitar

1997 albums
Angry Salad albums